Wilderness medicine education can refer to professional training or preparation for backcountry users such as hikers, climbers, skiers or kayakers.

 Emergency medicine
 Wilderness medicine education in the US
 Wilderness Medical Society
 Wilderness first aid certification in the US